Kuzeh Garan (also Romanized as Kūzeh Garān) is a village in Molla Sara Rural District, in the Central District of Shaft County, Gilan Province, Iran. At the 2006 census, its population was 356, in 93 families.

References 

Populated places in Shaft County